Jean Marie Rebischung is a French composer born 30 March 1962, in Marseilles, France.

Biography 
Composer of music serie Qigong, T'ai chi, and Yoga from Beatrice and Patrick Reynier.
 
Music of Asian inspiration, relaxing in particular tones, or Hindu for the Yoga series, it will be a dumping of electronic songs inspired by traditional songs, and completely in the developed style previously concept albums.

Movies 
Original music from: ( French version )

 Qi Gong pour s'assouplir : étirement dynamique des méridiens
 Qi Gong pour s'assouplir : étirement postural des méridiens
 Qi Gong pour tous : 1000 mains sacrées
 Qi Gong: les 8 pièces de brocart et les 5 animaux
 Qi Gong les 18 exercices du tai ji qi gong
 Tai Chi Chuan forme 8 mouvement spirales
 Tai Chi Chuan forme 23
 Tai Chi Chuan applications martiales
 Ashtanga Vinyasa Yoga découvrir les bases
 Ashtanga Vinyasa yoga approfondir la pratique
 Ashtanga Vinyasa yoga maitriser la première série

English version 

 The 18 Tai Chi Qi Gong - The 8 Pieces of Brocarde and the 5 Animals
 Tai Chi, Discover and begin to practise the Art of Tai Chi

References 

https://web.archive.org/web/20110714133638/http://www.music-story.com/rebischung/rebischung-qi-gong/telecharger

External links 
 rebischung.wix.com Official Website
 Béatrice Reynier
Jean Marie Rebischung Official MySpace (English)

VIAF Virtual International Authority File

1962 births
Living people
Musicians from Marseille
New-age musicians
Ambient musicians